"Good Things" is a song by American post-hardcore band Rival Schools. The song was released as the second and final single from the band's debut studio album United by Fate. The song peaked at no. 74 on the UK Singles Chart.

Track listing
CD single

Enhanced CD single

Charts

Personnel
Walter Schreifels – lead vocals, guitar
Ian Love – guitar, backing vocals
Cache Tolman – bass
Sammy Siegler – drums

References

2001 songs
2002 singles
Island Records singles